Agathidium cheneyi is a slime-mold beetle of the Leiodidae family. The species is known from a collection obtained in Chiapas, Mexico 

It was named after the former US vice President Dick Cheney by two researchers at Cornell University, one of sixty five newly described species that emerged from a review of several large museum collections of slime-mold beetles of the genus Agathidium. Along with taxa named for Donald Rumsfeld and George W. Bush, the entomologists stated that these epithets were a homage to these members of the US government rather than any specific resemblance.

References
Press Release from Cornell News

Leiodidae
Beetles described in 2005
Beetles of North America
Dick Cheney